Womer is an unincorporated community in Smith County, Kansas, United States.

History
A post office was opened in Womer in 1883, and remained in operation until it was discontinued in 1905.

References

Further reading

External links
 Smith County maps: Current, Historic, KDOT

Unincorporated communities in Smith County, Kansas
Unincorporated communities in Kansas